The Irish Wolfhound is an Irish breed of large sighthound. It is among the largest of all breeds of dog. It was developed in the late 19th century by G.A. Graham, whose aim was to recreate the old wolfhounds of Ireland, which were believed to be extinct. These had, by their presence and substantial size, inspired literature, poetry and mythology; indeed, they were used as guardian dogs and for the hunting of wolves.

The modern breed classified by recent genetic research into the Sighthound United Kingdom Rural Clade (Fig. S2), is used by coursing hunters who have prized it for its ability to dispatch game caught by other, swifter sighthounds.
In 1902, the Irish Wolfhound was declared the regimental mascot of the Irish Guards.

History

Pre-19th century
In 391, there is a reference to large dogs by Quintus Aurelius Symmachus, a Roman Consul who got seven "canes Scotici" as a gift to be used for fighting lions and bears, and who wrote "all Rome viewed (them) with wonder". Scoti is a Latin name for the Gaels (ancient Irish). Dansey, the early 19th century translator of the first complete version of Arrian's work in English, On Coursing, suggested the Irish and Scottish "greyhounds" were derived from the same ancestor, the vertragus, and had expanded with the Scoti from Ireland across the Western Isles and into what is today Scotland.

The dog-type is imagined by some to be very old. Wolfhounds were used as hunting dogs by the Gaels, who called them Cú Faoil ("hound" of "wolf" or wolfhound). Dogs are mentioned as cú in Irish laws and literature dating from the sixth century or, in the case of the Sagas, from the old Irish period, AD 600–900. The word cú was often used as an epithet for warriors as well as kings, denoting that they were worthy of the respect and loyalty of a hound. Cú Chulainn, a mythical warrior whose name means "hound of Culann", is supposed to have gained this name as a child when he slew the ferocious guard dog of Culann. As recompense he offered himself as a replacement.

In discussing the systematic evidence of historic dog sizes in Ireland, the Irish zooarchaeologist Finbar McCormick stressed that no dogs of Irish Wolfhound size are known from sites of the Iron Age period of 1000 BC through to the early Christian period to 1200 AD, and on the basis of the historic dog bones available, dogs of current Irish Wolfhound size seem to be a relatively modern development: "it must be concluded that the dog of Cú Chulainn was no larger than an Alsatian and not the calf-sized beast of the popular imagination".

Hunting dogs were coveted and were frequently given as gifts to important personages and foreign nobles. King John of England, in about 1210, presented an Irish hound named Gelert to Llywelyn, the Prince of Wales. The poet The Hon William Robert Spencer immortalized this hound in a poem.

In his Historie of Ireland completed 1571, Edmund Campion gives a description of the hounds used for hunting wolves in the Dublin and Wicklow mountains. He says: "They (the Irish) are not without wolves and greyhounds to hunt them, bigger of bone and limb than a colt". Due to their popularity overseas many were exported to European royal houses leaving numbers in Ireland depleted. This led to a declaration by Oliver Cromwell being published in Kilkenny on 27 April 1652 to ensure that sufficient numbers remained to control the wolf population.

References to the Irish Wolfhound in the 18th century tell of its great size, strength and greyhound shape as well as its scarcity. Writing in 1790, Bewick described it as the largest and most beautiful of the dog kind; about 36 inches high, generally of a white or cinnamon colour, somewhat like the Greyhound but more robust. He said that their aspect was mild, disposition peaceful, and strength so great that in combat the Mastiff or Bulldog was far from being an equal to them.

The last wolf in Ireland was killed in Co. Carlow in 1786. It is thought to have been killed at Myshall, on the slopes of Mount Leinster, by a pack of wolfdogs kept by a Mr Watson of Ballydarton. The wolfhounds that remained in the hands of a few families, who were mainly descendants of the old Irish chieftains, were now symbols of status rather than used as hunters, and these were said to be the last of their race.

Thomas Pennant (1726–1798) reported that he could find no more than three wolfdogs when he visited Ireland. During the 1836 meeting of the Geological Society of Dublin, Dr. Scouler presented the "Notices of Animals which have disappeared from Ireland", with the wolfdog mentioned.

Modern wolfhound

Captain George Augustus Graham (1833–1909) of Rednock House, Dursley, Gloucestershire was responsible for creating the modern Irish wolfhound breed. He stated that he could not find the breed "in its original integrity" to work with:

Graham acquired "Faust" of Kilfane, County Kilkenny and "Old Donagh" of Ballytobin; these were the respective progenitors of Graham's breeding program and said to descend from original Irish wolfhound strains. Based on the writings of others, he had formed the opinion that the wolfhound could be revived by crossing the biggest and best examples of the Scottish Deerhound with the Great Dane, two breeds which he believed were derived earlier from the wolfhound. Graham then outbred with the Duchess of Newcastle's Borzoi "Korotai", who had proved his wolf hunting ability in his native Russia, and for a ‘huge shaggy dog’, a Tibetan Mastiff "Wolf" entered into the modern wolfhound pedigree.

Garnier's "Lion" was bred to the Deerhound "Lufra", and their offspring "Marquis" entered wolfhound pedigrees through his granddaughter "Young Donagh". In 1885 Captain Graham with other breeders founded the Irish Wolfhound Club, and the Breed Standard of Points to establish and agree the ideal to which breeders should aspire.

The Wolfhound has been adopted as a symbol by both rugby codes. The national rugby league team is nicknamed the Wolfhounds, and the Irish Rugby Football Union, which governs rugby union, changed the name of the country's A (second-level) national team in that code to the Ireland Wolfhounds in 2010. One of the symbols that the tax authorities in both Ireland and Northern Ireland have on their revenue stamps has been the Irish wolfhound.  In the video game The Elder Scrolls V: Skyrim, the Irish Wolfhound is the breed of dog for all dogs in the base game.

DNA analysis
Genomic analysis indicates that although there has been some DNA sharing between the Irish wolfhound with the Deerhound, Whippet, and Greyhound, there has been significant sharing of DNA between the Irish Wolfhound and the Great Dane. One writer has stated that for the Irish Wolfhound, "the Great Dane appearance is strongly marked too prominently before the 20th Century". George Augustus Graham created the modern Irish wolfhound breed by retaining the appearance of the original form, but not its genetic ancestry.

Characteristics 

The Irish Wolfhound is characterised by its large size. It is more massively built than the Scottish Deerhound, but less so than the Great Dane.

The coat is hard and rough on the head, body and legs, with the beard and the hair over the eyes particularly wiry. It may be black, brindle, fawn, grey, red, pure white, or any colour seen in the Deerhound.

The Irish Wolfhound is a sighthound, and hunts by visual perception alone. The neck is muscular and fairly long, and the head is carried high. It should appear to be longer than it is tall,
and to be capable of catching and killing a wolf.

Temperament
Irish Wolfhounds have a varied range of personalities and are most often noted for their personal quirks and individualism. An Irish Wolfhound, however, is rarely mindless, and, despite its large size, is rarely found to be destructive in the house or boisterous. This is because the breed is generally introverted, intelligent, and reserved in character. An easygoing animal, the Irish Wolfhound is quiet by nature. Wolfhounds often create a strong bond with their family and can become quite destructive or morose if left alone for long periods of time.

The Irish Wolfhound makes for an effective and imposing guardian. Despite this, they are not suited to guard a house or their owner's possessions due to their independent and friendly nature. The breed becomes attached to both owners and other dogs they are raised with and is therefore not the most adaptable of breeds. Bred for independence, an Irish Wolfhound is not necessarily keen on defending spaces. A wolfhound is most easily described by its historical motto, "gentle when stroked, fierce when provoked".

They should not be territorially aggressive to other domestic dogs but are born with specialized skills and, it is common for hounds at play to course another dog. This is a specific hunting behavior, not a fighting or territorial domination behavior. Most Wolfhounds are very gentle with children. The Irish Wolfhound is relatively easy to train. They respond well to firm, but gentle, consistent leadership. However, historically these dogs were required to work at great distances from their masters and think independently when hunting rather than waiting for detailed commands and this can still be seen in the breed.

Irish Wolfhounds are often favored for their loyalty, affection, patience, and devotion. Although at some points in history they have been used as watchdogs, unlike some breeds, the Irish Wolfhound is usually unreliable in this role as they are often friendly toward strangers, although their size can be a natural deterrent. However, when protection is required this dog is never found wanting. When they or their family are in any perceived danger they display a fearless nature. Author and Irish Wolfhound breeder Linda Glover believes the dogs' close affinity with humans makes them acutely aware and sensitive to ill will or malicious intentions leading to their excelling as a guardian rather than guard dog.

Health
Like many large dog breeds, Irish Wolfhounds have a relatively short lifespan. Published lifespan estimations vary between 6 and 10 years with 7 years being the average. Dilated cardiomyopathy and bone cancer are the leading cause of death and like all deep-chested dogs, gastric torsion (bloat) is common; the breed is affected by hereditary intrahepatic portosystemic shunt.

In a privately funded study conducted under the auspices of the Irish Wolfhound Club of America and based on an owner survey, Irish Wolfhounds in the United States from 1966 to 1986 lived to a mean age of 6.47 and died most frequently of bone cancer. A more recent study by the UK Kennel Club puts the average age of death at 7 years.

Studies have shown that neutering is associated with a higher risk of bone cancer in various breeds, with one study suggesting that castration should be avoided at least until the dog is fully grown.

References

Further reading

 
 
 

Dog breeds originating in Ireland
FCI breeds
National symbols of Ireland
Royal Irish Regiment (1992)
Sighthounds
Wolf hunting